Dance FM UAE  was a dance radio station, from Dubai, belonging to Shock Middle East, which broadcast on 97.8FM in the Emirate of Dubai, UAE, and online. It was officially launched in September 2016 as the first full dance music radio station in the UAE.

In July 2017, Dance FM UAE was one of the official media partners for Belgian festival Tomorrowland.

Dance FM later relaunched its website and launched three new internet streams: Dance Urban Radio (playing non-stop local hip-hop and rap music), Dance Top 40 (playing non-stop chart music) and Dance Desi (playing non-stop Bollywood music).

In about September 2017, the schedule was revised. Many DJ sets were moved from the overnight hours (12-4am) to Friday lunchtime (12-3pm) and weekday late night hours (8-10pm).

The majority of programming is normal presenter-led music shows and live sets from 30 high-profile DJs. Live DJ sets are broadcast Sunday - Thursday 8pm - midnight, Friday midday - 1am and Saturday 6pm - midnight.

The Station officially shutdown in April 2020 and has since been renamed "Beat 97.8."

Programming

Local Programs 

 Beat @ Breakfast
 Beat the Lunch with Krishna
 Moore Beat with Steve Moore

Syndicated Programs 

 Heartfeldt Radio with Sam Feldt
 Heldeep Radio with Oliver Heldens
 The Martin Garrix Show
 Sugar Radio Robin Schulz
 Lost Radio with Lost Frequencies

References

External links 
 

Mass media in Dubai
Dance radio stations
Radio stations established in 2016
Radio stations established in 2020